Canada was the host of the 1976 Summer Paralympics in Toronto. Its athletes finished sixth in the overall medal count.

This was Canada's first and only appearance on Canadian soil.

Medalists

See also 
 Canada at the Paralympics
 Canada at the 1976 Summer Olympics

References 

Nations at the 1976 Summer Paralympics
1976
Paralympics